The Ostwald–Freundlich equation governs boundaries between two phases; specifically, it relates the surface tension of the boundary to its curvature, the ambient temperature, and the vapor pressure or chemical potential in the two phases.

The Ostwald–Freundlich equation for a droplet or particle with radius  is:

  = atomic volume
  = Boltzmann constant
  = surface tension (J  m−2)
  = equilibrium partial pressure (or chemical potential or concentration)
  = partial pressure (or chemical potential or concentration)
  = absolute temperature

One consequence of this relation is that small liquid droplets (i.e., particles with a high surface curvature) exhibit a higher effective vapor pressure, since the surface is larger in comparison to the volume.

Another notable example of this relation is Ostwald ripening, in which surface tension causes small precipitates to dissolve and larger ones to grow.  Ostwald ripening is thought to occur in the formation of orthoclase megacrysts in granites as a consequence of subsolidus growth. See rock microstructure for more.

History

In 1871, Lord Kelvin (William Thomson) obtained the following relation governing a liquid-vapor interface:

where:
  = vapor pressure at a curved interface of radius 
  = vapor pressure at flat interface = 
  = surface tension
  = density of vapor
  = density of liquid
 ,  = radii of curvature along the principal sections of the curved interface.

In his dissertation of 1885, Robert von Helmholtz (son of the German physicist Hermann von Helmholtz) derived the Ostwald–Freundlich equation and showed that Kelvin's equation could be transformed into the Ostwald–Freundlich equation.  The German physical chemist Wilhelm Ostwald derived the equation apparently independently in 1900; however, his derivation contained a minor error which the German chemist Herbert Freundlich corrected in 1909.

Derivation from Kelvin's equation 

According to Lord Kelvin's equation of 1871,

If the particle is assumed to be spherical, then ; hence,

Note: Kelvin defined the surface tension  as the work that was performed per unit area by the interface rather than on the interface; hence his term containing  has a minus sign.  In what follows, the surface tension will be defined so that the term containing  has a plus sign.

Since , then ; hence,

Assuming that the vapor obeys the ideal gas law, then

where:
 = mass of a volume  of vapor
 = molecular weight of vapor 
 = number of moles of vapor in volume  of vapor
 = Avogadro constant
 = ideal gas constant = 

Since  is the mass of one molecule of vapor or liquid, then

 volume of one molecule  .

Hence
 where  .

Thus

Since

then

Since  , then  . If , then . Hence

Therefore

which is the Ostwald–Freundlich equation.

See also
Köhler theory
Kelvin equation

References

Thermodynamic equations
Petrology
Surface science